The Spearfish Sasquatch is a baseball team in the Independence League Baseball based in Spearfish, South Dakota. They are one of two teams based in South Dakota, their home games are played at Black Hills Energy Stadium. They were formed in October 2017. They played in the Expedition League in 2018, 2019 and 2021 before joining the new Independence League Baseball for the 2022 season.

Record by year 

Due to the COVID-19 pandemic, the Spearfish Sasquatch opted out of the 2020 season.

Coaching staff
Head Coach: Jarrett Hunt
Assistant Coach: Anthony Peterson

References

Amateur baseball teams in South Dakota
2017 establishments in South Dakota
Baseball teams established in 2017
Spearfish, South Dakota
Expedition League